The Zamboanga Football Association is a Filipino football association based in Zamboanga City. It works under the Philippine Football Federation as provincial football association for the Zamboanga province.  The Zamboanga FA sends a team to represent the region in the yearly PFF National Men's Club Championship.

Football governing bodies in the Philippines
Sports in Zamboanga del Sur